Yumiko Kato (born 1 January 1968) is a Japanese luger. She competed in the women's singles event at the 1984 Winter Olympics.

References

1968 births
Living people
Japanese female lugers
Olympic lugers of Japan
Lugers at the 1984 Winter Olympics
Sportspeople from Sapporo